Prince Sigismund of Prussia may refer to:
Prince Sigismund of Prussia (1864–1866): lived 22 months
Prince Sigismund of Prussia (1896–1978): lived 81 years